Neochori is a village in the municipality of Zacharo, southern Elis, Greece. It is situated on the Gulf of Kyparissia, a part of the Ionian Sea. The foothills of the Minthi are east of the village. Neochori is 3 km southeast of Kakovatos, 5 km northwest of Giannitsochori and 6 km south of Zacharo. The Greek National Road 9/E55 (Pyrgos - Kyparissia) and the railway from Pyrgos to Kalamata run east of the village.

Historical population

See also
List of settlements in Elis

References

Populated places in Elis